La Yaya Dam is an embankment dam on the Guantánamo River near the town of La Yaya in the municipality of Niceto Pérez in Guantánamo Province, Cuba.

References

Dams in Cuba
Dams completed in 1973
Buildings and structures in Guantánamo Province
20th-century architecture in Cuba